Roswitha März (born October 15, 1940) is a German mathematician known for her research on differential-algebraic systems of equations. She is a professor emeritus of mathematics at the Humboldt University of Berlin.

Education and career
März was born on October 15, 1940 in Varnsdorf, now part of the Czech Republic. Beginning in 1960 she studied mathematics at the University of Leningrad, now Saint Petersburg State University, earning a diploma in 1965. She earned a doctorate (Dr. sc. nat.) from the Chemnitz University of Technology in 1970. Her dissertation, Interpolation mit Parameteroptimierung, was supervised by Frieder Kuhnert.

She worked at the Humboldt University of Berlin beginning in 1968, first as a researcher and later as a faculty member, serving as dean of the mathematics faculty from 1990 to 1991 and becoming University Professor in 1992.

Books
März is the author or coauthor of books including:
Differential-algebraic equations: a projector based analysis (with René Lamour and Caren Tischendorf, Springer, 2013)
Differential-algebraic equations and their numerical treatment (with Eberhard Griepentrog, Teubner, 1986)
Parametric multistep methods (Humboldt University, 1979)

References

External links
Home page

1940 births
Living people
People from Varnsdorf
20th-century German mathematicians
German women mathematicians
Saint Petersburg State University alumni
Chemnitz University of Technology alumni
Academic staff of the Humboldt University of Berlin
20th-century German women